Michael Jepsen Jensen (born 18 February 1992) is a motorcycle speedway rider from Denmark.

Career
He was part of the 2010 Under-21 World Cup winning Denmark team. He also won the 2012 Nordic Speedway Grand Prix becoming the 1st wildcard to have won a GP meeting since Hans Andersen. In November 2012 he won the Individual Under-21 World Championship.

In 2022, he helped Smederna win the Swedish Speedway Team Championship during the 2022 campaign.

Career details

World Championships 
 Individual U-21 World Championship
 2010 – lost in the Qualifying Round Five
 Team U-21 World Championship
 2010 –  Rye House – Under-21 World Champion (12 pts)
 Speedway Grand Prix Qualification
 2010 – track reserve at the Qualifying Round One
Individual U-21 World Championship
 2012 Bahía Blanca, Argentina

 European Championships 
 Individual U-19 European Championship
 2010 –  Goričan – 6th placed (10 pts)
 Team U-19 European Championship
 2009 –  Holsted – 3rd placed (10 pts)
 2010 – lost in the Semi-Final One''

See also 
 Denmark national under-21 speedway team (U-19)

References 

1992 births
Living people
Danish speedway riders
Team Speedway Junior World Champions
People from Billund Municipality
Sportspeople from the Region of Southern Denmark